Greatest Hits Radio North East is a local radio station serving North East England, as part of Bauer’s Greatest Hits Radio network.

History

Great North Radio (also known as G.N.R) was formed in March 1989 using the AM frequencies of Metro Radio and Radio Tees. This happened after the Metro Radio group decided to split the FM and AM frequencies up.

GNR's output consisted of mellow music from the 1950s through to the 1980s, including current hits that fitted the format. There were also specialist programmes each evening, including Country Music, Jazz, and Classical.

In 1996, Emap bought Metro Radio and at the start of 1997, Emap decided to scrap Great North Radio and replaced it with local stations under the brand name of Magic, with a new format of Hot Adult Contemporary music. Magic 1152 launched on 19 February 1998.

In December 2001, Emap decided that it was more economical for the Magic network to share off-peak programmes and in line with the other Magic AM stations began networking between 10am-2pm, and 7pm-6am. During these hours it was simply known as Magic, although there were local commercial breaks, and local news on the hour.

In January 2003, after a sharp decline in listening, the station ceased networking with the London station, Magic 105.4, and a regional northern network was created with Manchester's Magic 1152 at the hub at the weekend and the Newcastle station as the hub during the week. This arrangement remained until 2006, when all network programmes were broadcast from Newcastle. During networked hours, local adverts are aired, as well as a local news summary on the hour during the day. IRN is taken in the evening and overnight.

From July 2006, more networking was introduced across the Northern Magic AM network leaving just the legal minimum of 4 hours a day of programming - the breakfast show - presented from the local studios. All other programming was networked from Newcastle however some is also produced in Manchester and now London. Shows are recorded also on Saturdays from 1-6pm.

On 4 March 2013, the one remaining local show - weekday breakfast - became a syndicated regional programme as on this day the programme, presented by Anna Foster, started broadcasting on Tees-side sister station Magic 1170. The regional breakfast show was axed in December 2014 ahead of the launch of Metro Radio 2 and all programming is networked with the other Bauer AM stations in the North although local news, weather and travel continue to be broadcast as opt-outs during the day.

On 7 January 2019, Metro 2 Radio rebranded as Greatest Hits North East.

Programming
The station carries primarily a schedule of networked programming, produced and broadcast from Bauer's Manchester, Liverpool, Birmingham and Glasgow studios, and from Bauer's Golden Square headquarters in Soho.

Regional programming consisted (until April 2022) of Night Owls with Alan Robson, which was produced and broadcast from Bauer's Newcastle studios, airing each Sunday 10pm-2am. This was syndicated with the sister station in Teesside.

News
Bauer’s Newcastle newsroom broadcasts local news bulletins hourly from 06:00 to 19:00 on weekdays and from 07:00 to 13:00 at weekends. Headlines are broadcast on the half-hour during weekday breakfast and drivetime shows, alongside traffic bulletins. National bulletins from Sky News Radio are carried at other times.

The local news team in Newcastle also produces bulletins for Greatest Hits Radio Teesside.

References

External links
 

Bauer Radio
Greatest Hits Radio
Mass media in Newcastle upon Tyne
Radio stations in North East England
Radio stations established in 1989